Chavicol (p-allylphenol) is a natural phenylpropene, a type of organic compound.  Its chemical structure consists of a benzene ring substituted with a hydroxy group and a propenyl group. It is a colorless liquid found together with terpenes in betel oil.

Properties and reactions
Chavicol is miscible with alcohol, ether, and chloroform.  Dimerization of chavicol gives the neo-lignan magnolol.

Uses
Chavicol is used as an odorant in perfumery and as a flavor. It is found in many essential oils, including anise and Gardenia.

Biosynthesis

Chavicol is formed in sweet basil (Ocimum Basilicum) by the phenylpropanoid pathway via p-coumaryl alcohol. The allylic alcohol in p-coumaryl alcohol is converted into a leaving group. This then leaves thus forming a cation, this cation can be regarded as a quinone methide which then is reduced by NADPH to form either anol or chavicol.

See also
 Estragole, the methyl ether
 Safrole, a methylenedioxy analog

References
 

Phenols
Allyl compounds
Perfume ingredients
Phenylpropenes